Kurt Nielsen defeated Sven Davidson in the final, 8–6, 6–1, 9–7 to win the inaugural Boys' Singles tennis title at the 1947 Wimbledon Championships.

Draw

Final

Group A

Group B

The nationality of JE Rudd is unknown.

References

External links

Boys' Singles
Wimbledon Championship by year – Boys' singles